Al-Hamma was a Palestinian Arab village in the Tiberias Subdistrict,  southeast of Tiberias. It was situated on a narrow salient in the Yarmouk Valley bounded by Syria to the north and Transjordan to the south and east. Al-Hamma was one of the stations on the Jezreel Valley railway, linking the Hejaz Railway to Haifa. It was depopulated twice, once in July 1949, and again between 1949 and 1956.

History

Emmatha, Roman and Byzantine periods
During the Roman Empire it was known as Emmatha. During this period, Al-Hamma belonged to the district of Gadara.

Early Muslim Period
Recent excavations have revealed a large Umayyad public building comprising several rooms with mosaic floors, set with red, black and white tesserae. The building seems to have been destroyed by the 749 Golan earthquake, but was rebuilt and used until finally abandoned after the earthquake of 1033.

Ottoman Empire

Al-Hamma appeared in Ottoman tax registers compiled in 1596 under the name of Hammat Jur, in the Nahiyas of Gawr, of the Liwa of Ajloun. It was indicated as empty (hali), though taxes were paid on a watermill, in addition to a fixed sum.

In 1875, the French explorer Victor Guérin visited the village.

In 1905, the Jezreel Valley railway opened, linking Haifa via Samakh and Al-Hamma to the Hejaz Railway at Daraa.

British Mandate of Palestine

In the 1922 census of Palestine, conducted by the British Mandate authorities, Samakh and Al-Hamma were counted together, reaching a total population of 976. Of these, 922 were Muslims, 28 Jews, 1 Baháʼí and 25 Christians;  where the Christians were 6 Orthodox, 1 Roman Catholic, 2 Melkite, 11 Armenian and 5 Anglican.  At the time of the 1931 census, the village had 46 occupied houses and a population of 170 Muslims, 1 Jew and 1 Christian.

In 1936, a Lebanese businessman, Sulayman Nasif, was given a concession to develop the local springs, which became a popular place to visit, both for local Palestinians and other Arabs. In   the 1945 statistics, the village had a population of 290 Muslims, who cultivated a total of 1,105 dunums of land. The villagers were mostly Muslim and Al-Hamma had a large mosque with a fountain in the front courtyard.

1948 and aftermath

During the early part of the 1948 Palestine war, some Palestinian inhabitants of Tiberias fled to Al-Hamma during the unrest in March and April that year. A local leader from Tiberias, Sidqi al Tabari, made "desperate efforts" (according to Israeli sources) to bring the citizens back. The people who had fled to al-Hamma from Tiberias were "ordered back and, in fact, returned".

According to Morris, many villagers in the area had fled or been expelled to Syria during April and early May 1948. However, on 16 May, the villages came under Syrian control and many inhabitants returned. After the war, according to the armistice agreements of 1949 Between Israel and Syria, it was determined that a string of villages, including Al-Hamma, Nuqeib, Al-Samra in the Tiberias Subdistrict and Kirad al-Baqqara and Kirad al-Ghannama further north in the Safad Subdistrict, would be included the demilitarized zone (DMZ) between Israel and Syria. The villagers and their property were formally protected by Article V of the Israeli-Syrian agreement of 20 July that year. However, Israel wanted the 2,200 Palestinian inhabitants moved to Syria. The Israeli military
thought that the inhabitants of the DMZ remained loyal to Syria and they suspected them of helping Syrian intelligence. Local Jewish settlers and law enforcement suspected the villagers of petty crimes. Morris also notes that Israeli settlers and settlement agencies coveted the land of the local Palestinians Arabs.

Until 1951, Israel had never patrolled or occupied al-Hamma. However, in the spring of that year, Israel decided to assert its claimed sovereignty over the village. On 4 April that year, the IDF General Staff (ignoring protests from the Northern Command) sent two patrol vehicles towards the village. Since Israel was not allowed to have soldiers in the DMZ, the patrol was disguised as policemen. In what became known as the Al-Hamma Incident, seven Israeli soldiers were killed by the Syrians. The following day, four Israeli planes bombed the police station at Al-Hamma and a Syrian position at Al Hadid. Two women were killed, and six people reported injured. According to Walid Khalidi, Israel then decided to "drive the villagers out", and proceeded to do so during 1949–1956. He described the village site in 1992:The site has been converted into an Israeli tourist park (Hamat Gader), with parking facilities, swimming pools, and a small fishing pond. The deserted mosque still stands, and its minaret and marble columns are intact. Five buildings east of the village site are built of black basalt. The railroad station still exist and the name of the village is inscribed on its entrance. There are three more deserted buildings next to the station, as well as the remains of destroyed houses.

See also
Hama (disambiguation)
Hamat Gader, current name of the site and a tourist resort
Gadara (now Umm Qais), the mother-city in antiquity

References

Bibliography

 

 (Sharon, 2013, p. 283)

External links
Welcome To al-Hamma
al-Hamma, Zochrot
Al-Hamma at Khalil Sakakini Cultural Center

Arab villages depopulated during the 1948 Arab–Israeli War
District of Tiberias